John Kavanagh (born June 5, 1950) is an American politician who has served in both houses of the Arizona State Legislature since 2007. He is currently representing the 3rd legislative district in the Arizona Senate since 2023.

Kavanagh represented District 23 in the Arizona House of Representatives representing from 2013 to 2015, District 8 from 2007 to 2013, and District 23 from 2019 to 2023. He was a police officer with the Port Authority of New York and New Jersey and retired as a detective sergeant, after 20 years of service. He is currently a professor of criminal justice at Scottsdale Community College (AZ), where he is Program Director of the Administration of Justice Studies and Forensic Science Programs.

Education and early life
The grandson of Irish and German immigrants who came to Ellis Island in the early 20th century, he was born in Queens, New York.

John Kavanagh earned his BA in liberal arts from New York University, his MA in government from St. John's University, and his PhD in criminal justice from Rutgers University.

Kavanagh was a Port Authority Police Officer for 20 years and retired as a detective sergeant. He served at Kennedy Airport, where he was also on the crash crew, the Port Authority Bus Terminal in the Times Square area of New York City and also taught in the police academy. Upon retiring from the Port Authority Police, Kavanagh moved to Fountain Hills, Arizona and taught as an adjunct and later full-time instructor at Arizona State University for several years and then was a professor of criminal justice and program director at Scottsdale Community for 15 years. He retired from SCC in 2017 but teaches there as an adjunct.

Elections
 2014 Elected to the Arizona State Senate in District 23, defeating Democrat Paula Pennypacker, and replacing Sen. Michele Reagan, who was elevated to Secretary of State in the same election.
 2012 Redistricted to District 23 alongside incumbent Representative Michelle Ugenti, and with incumbent Republican Representatives John Fillmore running for Arizona Senate and Frank Pratt redistricted to District 8, Kavanagh ran alongside Representative Ugenti in the three-way August 28, 2012 Republican Primary; Kavanagh placed first with 20,922 votes and Representative Ugenti placed second; they were unopposed for the November 6, 2012 General election, where Representative Ugenti took the first seat and Kavanagh took the second seat with 68,827 votes.
 2010 With Representative Reagan running for Arizona Senate and leaving a District 8 seat open, Kavanagh ran in the six-way August 24, 2010 Republican Primary and placed first with 18,081 votes; in the three-way November 2, 2010 General election Kavanagh took the first seat with 43,867 votes and fellow Republican nominee Michelle Ugenti took the second seat ahead of Democratic nominee John Kriekard.
 2008 Kavanagh and Representative Reagan were unopposed for the September 2, 2008 Republican Primary; Representative Reagan placed first and Kavanagh placed second with 14,532 votes; in the three-way November 2, 2010 General election, Representative Reagan took the first seat and Kavanagh took the second seat with 50,507 votes ahead of Democratic nominee Stephanie Rimmer.
 2006 When incumbent Republican Representative Colette Rosati ran for Arizona Senate and left a District 8 seat open, Kavanagh ran in the five-way September 12, 2006 Republican Primary, taking second place with 7,979 votes; in the four-way November 7, 2006 General election, Representative Michele Reagan took the first seat and Kavanagh took the second seat with 35,260 ahead of Democratic nominees Stephanie Rimmer and H. William Sandberg.
 2000-2006 Was appointed to fill an open two-year term on the Fountain Hills Town Council and then was elected to another four-year term.
 1978-1981 Elected twice to the Lafayette, New Jersey Town Council.

Tenure in the legislature
In February 2019, Kavanagh belittled a humanist invocation made by Representative Athena Salman, an atheist legislator, on the floor of the Arizona House of Representatives. In the invocation, Salman asked legislators to consider the "wonders of the universe" and the diversity of life on an "insignificant planet in an insignificant galaxy" and made reference to a deity. Kavanagh responded by mocking Salman's statement, prompting Salman and fellow Democrats to lodge a protest against Kavanagh and state that he had exhibited "behavior unbecoming of a member" in violation of the chamber's rules. Kavanaugh contended that Salman had "hijacking of the prayer and turning it into a secular commercial" and acted "to restore God to the prayer."

Kavanagh sponsored legislation to limit disability access lawsuits against businesses based on the Arizonans with Disabilities Act. The bill, in its amended form, gave businesses a "cure period" during which they can correct violations and avoid litigation. Disability rights groups opposed the legislation.

Kavanagh sponsored legislation granting immunity from civil liability to people who break into locked vehicles to rescue children and pets from overheating on hot days; the bill passed the Senate on a 35–20 vote, and then a 20–7 vote, before being approved by the governor.

Kavanagh made news for his controversial comment on inmate Regan Clarine being asked to treat her C-section with sugar. He reportedly commented "That doesn't sound like a true allegation. That sounds ridiculous. Prisoners have 24/7 to think of allegations and write letters. I'm not saying that some of them can't have a basis in fact, but you gotta take them with a grain of salt, or, in the case of the hospital, maybe a grain of sugar."

Kavanagh was the lead sponsor of a bill to remove 11 phrases from Arizona's 9/11 Memorial. The 11 phrases were among 54 phrases chosen by the design committee from a selection of Arizona newspaper clippings shortly after the September 11 attack. Kavanagh specifically wanted the phrases "09 15 01 Balbir Singh Sodhi, a Sikh, murdered in Mesa"; "You don't win battles of terrorism with more battles" and "Foreign-born Americans afraid" to be removed from the memorial. The first phrase referenced a Sikh man who was murdered in a hate crime in Arizona by a white supremacist four days after the September 11, 2001 attacks. Kavanagh acknowledged that "he did only a cursory Internet search" on Sodhi's murder, but contended that Sodhi was "not a victim of 9/11" and asserted that "It's part of a myth that, following 9/11, Americans went into a xenophobic rage against foreigners. That's not true. America's reaction towards foreigners was commendable." The bill passed the state legislature on party-line votes, but was vetoed by Governor Jan Brewer.

In 2016, Kavanagh sponsored a bill to make it a criminal offense for any person to record police officers within twenty feet, even in a public space. Legal experts stated that the proposal was facially unconstitutional, and the American Civil Liberties Union criticized the proposal. After coming under criticism, Kavanagh withdrew the bill before it could receive a hearing.

Kavanagh sponsored an anti-transgender "bathroom bill" to block municipalities from requiring private businesses to allow transgender people to use restrooms that match their gender identities; Kavanagh introduced the bill after the City of Phoenix extended its anti-discrimination ordinance to cover LGBT discrimination.

In March 2021, as the Republican Party pursued a sweeping effort to suppress voting access nationwide following false claims of widespread voter fraud in the 2020 United States presidential election, Kavanagh justified voting restrictions with the statement: "Everybody shouldn’t be voting...Quantity is important, but we have to look at the quality of votes, as well."

In 2021, Kavanagh sponsored legislation that would prohibit oversight boards of police departments unless those boards were two-thirds sworn police officers. The bill aimed to block the City of Phoenix's newly established Office of Accountability and Transparency, a civilian police oversight agency, from overseeing police misconduct investigations. Gov. Doug Ducey signed HB 2567 into law in 2021 with it going into effect the summer of 2021.

In 2022, Kavanagh sponsored legislation that would require the publication of the names and addresses of all eligible voters in elections.

References

External links
 Official page at the Arizona State Legislature
 
 Biography at Ballotpedia
 Financial information (contributor) at OpenSecrets

1950 births
21st-century American politicians
Republican Party Arizona state senators
Arizona State University faculty
Living people
Republican Party members of the Arizona House of Representatives
New York University alumni
People from Fountain Hills, Arizona
Rutgers University alumni
St. John's University (New York City) alumni